The 2015–16 season was Falkirk's sixth consecutive season in the second tier of Scottish football, having been relegated from the Scottish Premier League at the end of season 2009–10. Falkirk also competed in the Challenge Cup, League Cup and the Scottish Cup.

Summary

Season
Falkirk finished as runners-up in the Scottish Championship and qualified for the Premiership play-off. Despite taking the lead in the 1st leg, Falkirk were beaten 4–1 by Kilmarnock on aggregate and remained in the Championship for another season.

Results & fixtures

Scottish Championship

Premiership play-off

Scottish Challenge Cup

Scottish League Cup

Scottish Cup

Player statistics
During the 2015–16 season, Falkirk have used twenty-five different players in competitive games. The table below shows the number of appearances and goals scored by each player. 

a.  Includes other competitive competitions, including the play-offs and the Challenge Cup.

Disciplinary record

Club statistics

League table

Division summary

Management statistics
Last updated on 22 May 2016

Transfers

Players in

Players out

See also
List of Falkirk F.C. seasons

Notes

References

Falkirk
Falkirk F.C. seasons